Albert Jones may refer to:

 Albert Beckford Jones (born 1958), American businessman
 Albert Edward Jones (1878–1954), English silversmith and designer
 Albert F. A. L. Jones (1920–2013), New Zealand astronomer
 Albert F. Jones (1858–1920), member of the California Senate, 1887–1890
 Albert Gamaliel Jones (1812–c. 1880), American architect
 Albert Jones (footballer, born 1883) (1883–1963), Nottingham Forest F.C. and Wales international footballer
 Albert M. Jones (1890–1967), American major general during World War II
 Cowboy Jones (Albert Edward Jones, 1874–1958), baseball pitcher
 Robert Albert Jones (1864–?), Welsh international footballer
 Arthur Jones (Conservative politician) (Albert Arthur Jones, 1915–1991), British Conservative MP

See also
Al Jones (disambiguation)
Bert Jones (disambiguation)
Albert Evans-Jones (1895–1970), Welsh poet and dramatist